Drink me may refer to:

 "Drink Me" (Batwoman), an episode of Batwoman
"Drink me", a reference to Alice's Adventures in Wonderland
Drink Me (Queenadreena album), 2002
Drink Me (Poisoned Electrick Head album)
 Drink Me, a 1995 album by Salad
"Drink Me", a song on Anna Nalick's debut album, Wreck of the Day

See also 
 Eat Me (disambiguation)